

Regular season
In head coach Lee Rose's first season at Purdue, where he introduced a slowed-down, tempo-controlled style of play, he led the Boilers to a Big Ten Conference co-title, along with Iowa and the eventual NCAA Champion, Ervin Johnson-led Michigan State. With only a 32 team NCAA Tournament field in 1979, the Boilermakers were forced to enter the NIT, instead, due to the favor Michigan State had over Purdue for their head-to-head record on the season. Purdue qualified for the National Invitation Tournament, where they lost to the Indiana Hoosiers in the tournament finals.

National Invitation Tournament
First Round
Purdue 97, Central Michigan 80
Second Round
Purdue 84, Dayton 70
Quarterfinal
Purdue 67, Old Dominion 59
Semifinal
Purdue 87, Alabama 68
Final
Indiana 53, Purdue 52

Awards and honors

Team players drafted into the NBA

References

Purdue
Purdue Boilermakers men's basketball seasons
Purdue
Purdue Boilermakers men's basketball
Purdue Boilermakers men's basketball